Taank Kingdom (also known as Takka or Taki) was a kingdom based in Punjab, during 6th and 7th centuries. The main source regarding the kingdom are the chronicles of Xuanzang as well as other sources. The kingdom was located south of Kashmir, north of Sindh and east of Zunbil dynasty, extending from the Indus river in the west to the Beas river in the east, centered around modern day Sialkot.

Etymology
A "Tseh-kia" kingdom is mentioned by Hiuen-Tsang (631-643 A.D.). It is mentioned by him as situated towards east of Gandhara. The Chach Nama (history of Sindh) mentions it as Tak. The earliest Muslim author who mentions the kingdom is a merchant named Sulaiman. He visited the area before 851 AD, when his account was written. In his account, the kingdom is mentioned as Táfak. In 915 AD, the Arab historian Al-Masudi mentions it as at-Tákin, referring to the hills of the Punjab region. The name is read Tákin by Sir Henry Elliott, and Táfan by Gildemeister, in his extracts from Masudi. 

Takin, Tafan, Tafak, Taffa, Takas, and Takishar, are various readings of the original form which is Taki or Takin. M. Reinaud gives another spelling, Tában.

History
Ibn Khordadbeh, who died in 912 AD, mentions the king of the confederacy as next in eminence to the Balhara, whereas Kazwini mentions a fort named Taifand, the location of the fort agrees with the account of the hill of Sangala (near modern Sialkot).

They are included among 36 royal dynasties mentioned by James Tod. According to him the names of some of the rulers were Ratapat, Bahurpal, Sahajpal and Madanpal.

Xuanzang's visit
During Xuanzang's visit, the neighboring state of Bofadou was a vassal (or province) of Taank. He also noted Mihirakula's capital to have been at Sagala within Taank. Despite having an illustrious Buddhist heritage as evident from three colossal stupas, Buddhism had declined in the region (Punjab) after the Gupta period due to preference give to the propagation of Hinduism, and later collapsed after the Alchon Hun persecution, resulting in it being sparsely practiced in only about ten monasteries. On the contrary, Brahminical Hinduism rose as the primary religion in the region and there were several hundreds of Hindu Deva shrines. He visited Lahore in 630 AD during Taank rule and described it as a great Brahmin city.

"The country of Takka is south of Kashmira, extending from the Indus river to its west and Vipasha river to its east. They produce abundant quantities of non-sticky rice and wheat, also gold, brass, iron and other metals. They do not believe in Buddhism, and pray in several hundred deva temples. This country has ten Buddhist monasteries left." There were many more before, states Xuanzang.

See Also
History of Punjab

References

Bibliography

History of Hinduism
Ancient empires and kingdoms of India
History of Lahore
Hinduism in Punjab, Pakistan